The Club (Spanish: El Club), is Mexican crime drama streaming television series directed by Camila Ibarra and produced by Argos Comunicación. The series revolves around a group of rich young people who get involved, through an application, in drug trafficking until they get to have contact with much more powerful people and that's when they get into serious problems. It stars Alejandro Speitzer, Minnie West, and Jorge Caballero.

Cast 
 Alejandro Speitzer as Pablo Caballero
 Minnie West as Sofía
 Jorge Caballero as Matías
 Ana Gonzalez Bello as Ana Pau
 Axel Arenas as Jonás
 Arcelia Ramírez as María
 Alejandro Puente as Santiago Caballero
 Juan Ríos as Monkey
 Martín Saracho
 Vicente Tamayo
 Aurora Gil as Lola
 Estrella Solís as Penélope / Polly
 Martha Julia as Regina Caballero
 Ignacio Tahhan as Gonzalo Cisneros
 Marco Antonio Tostado as Diego

Episodes

Season 1 (2019)

References

External links 
 

Spanish-language Netflix original programming
2019 Mexican television series debuts
Mexican crime television series
Works about Mexican drug cartels